Eric Eidsness is an American football coach and former player. He is the offensive coordinator at Northern Illinois University.  Eidsness was the head football coach at Southwest Minnesota State University in Marshall, Minnesota for six seasons, from 2004 to 2009, compiling a record of 26–40.  After leaving Southwest Minnesota State he was appointed assistant coach for quarterbacks and receivers at South Dakota State University.

Playing career
Eidsness played college football at the University of Sioux Falls, starring at quarterback and wide receiver. He also played two professional seasons 1992-1993 in France Ligue Élite de Football Américain (D1 Elite League), where he also started his coaching career.

Head coaching record

References

External links
 Northern Illinois profile
 South Dakota State profile

Year of birth missing (living people)
Living people
American football quarterbacks
American football wide receivers
Ferris State Bulldogs football coaches
Morningside Mustangs football coaches
Northern Illinois Huskies football coaches
South Dakota State Jackrabbits football coaches
Sioux Falls Cougars football players
Southwest Minnesota State Mustangs football coaches
St. Cloud State Huskies football players
American expatriate sportspeople in France
American expatriate players of American football